Superfund sites are polluted locations in the United States requiring a long-term response to clean up hazardous material contaminations. They were designated under the Comprehensive Environmental Response, Compensation, and Liability Act (CERCLA) of 1980. CERCLA authorized the United States Environmental Protection Agency (EPA) to create a list of such locations, which are placed on the National Priorities List (NPL).

The NPL guides the EPA in "determining which sites warrant further investigation" for environmental remediation. , there were 1,329 Superfund sites on the National Priorities List in the United States. Forty-three additional sites have been proposed for entry on the list, and 452 sites have been cleaned up and removed from the list. New Jersey, California, and Pennsylvania have the most sites.

Lists of Superfund sites

U.S. states and federal district

 Alabama
 Alaska
 Arizona
 Arkansas
 California
 Colorado
 Connecticut
 Delaware
 District of Columbia
 Florida
 Georgia
 Hawaii
 Idaho
 Illinois
 Indiana
 Iowa
 Kansas
 Kentucky
 Louisiana
 Maine
 Maryland
 Massachusetts
 Michigan
 Minnesota
 Mississippi
 Missouri
 Montana
 Nebraska
 Nevada
 New Hampshire
 New Jersey
 New Mexico
 New York
 North Carolina
 North Dakota
 Ohio
 Oklahoma
 Oregon
 Pennsylvania
 Rhode Island
 South Carolina
 South Dakota
 Tennessee
 Texas
 Utah
 Vermont
 Virginia
 Washington
 West Virginia
 Wisconsin
 Wyoming

Insular areas

 American Samoa
 Guam
 Northern Mariana Islands
 Puerto Rico
 U.S. Virgin Islands

See also
Agency for Toxic Substances and Disease Registry
Environmental issues in the United States
List of environmental issues
List of waste types
TOXMAP

References

External links
Superfund Sites: 1,317 US Spots Where Toxic Waste Was Dumped—Time (March 22, 2017)
 US EPA Superfund
National Priorities List Sites - by State
Superfund National Priorities List (NPL) Where You Live Map

 
Superfund
Superfund